Guizhou or Gui Prefecture (桂州) was a zhou (prefecture) in imperial China centering on modern Guilin, Guangxi, China. It existed (intermittently) from 507 to 1133.

Geography
The administrative region of Guizhou in the Tang dynasty falls within modern Guilin in northeastern Guangxi. It probably includes modern: 
Guilin
Yangshuo County
Lingchuan County
Xing'an County
Lingui County

References
 

Prefectures of the Tang dynasty
Guangnan West Circuit
Prefectures of Ma Chu
Prefectures of the Sui dynasty
Former prefectures in Guangxi
Prefectures of Southern Han